Jim Pattison Children's Hospital is one of four hospitals in Saskatoon, Saskatchewan. It is located on the University of Saskatchewan campus and is connected via corridor to the Royal University Hospital. It is located along the banks of the South Saskatchewan River. It was opened on September 29, 2019.

The facility is operated by the Saskatchewan Health Authority. It is equipped with a helipad, used by Shock Trauma Air Rescue Society. It includes a pediatric intensive care unit and a neonatal intensive care unit. The facility's Child Life Zone was created through a partnership between Garth Brooks' Teammates for Kids Foundation and the Jim Pattison Children's Hospital Foundation.

The facility is named after Canadian business magnate Jim Pattison after a $50 million donation was announced in May 2017 by then Premier of Saskatchewan Brad Wall.

See also 

 St. Paul's Hospital
 Saskatoon City Hospital
 Royal University Hospital

External links 

 Official website

References 

Hospitals in Saskatchewan
Hospitals established in 2019
Buildings and structures in Saskatoon
Children's hospitals in Canada
2019 establishments in Saskatchewan
Heliports in Canada
Certified airports in Saskatchewan